The Frank Sinatra Show is an ABC variety and drama series, starring Frank Sinatra, premiering on October 18, 1957, and last airing on June 27, 1958.

Summary 
This was Sinatra's second attempt at a television series, his first was The Frank Sinatra Show on CBS Television between 1950–1952.

The series was originally slated to consist of thirteen variety episodes, thirteen dramas starring Sinatra, and ten dramas hosted by Sinatra, filmed at the El Capitan Theatre in Hollywood rather than broadcast live. Sinatra was paid $3 million for the series, and granted near total artistic freedom.

The drama segments of the show fared less well against the variety episodes in ratings and the final total was fourteen live variety shows, eight filmed variety shows, four dramas starring Sinatra, and six dramas hosted by Sinatra. Rather than 36 episodes for the season, ABC cut its losses and reduced the total number to 32.

Sinatra hated rehearsing, and tried to make eleven shows in fifteen days; the series subsequently received a critical mauling and was Sinatra's last attempt at a television series.

Guest appearances
 Bing Crosby
 Sammy Davis, Jr.
 Ella Fitzgerald
 Bob Hope
 Peggy Lee
 Dean Martin
 Ethel Merman
 Robert Mitchum
 Pat Suzuki
 Natalie Wood
 Peter Lawford

Episodes

Bob Hope, Peggy Lee and Kim Novak - Oct. 18, 1957
That Hogan Man - Oct. 25, 1957
The Tri-Tones - Nov. 1, 1957
Peggy Lee - Nov. 8, 1957
The McGuire Sisters - Nov. 15, 1957
Erin O'Brien - Nov. 22, 1957
Dean Martin - Nov. 29, 1957
A Gun at His Back - Dec. 6, 1957
Take Me Back to Hollywood - Dec. 13, 1957
Happy Holidays with Bing and Frank - Dec. 20, 1957
The Feeling is Mutual - Dec. 27, 1957
Dinah Shore - Jan. 3, 1958
Robert Mitchum - Jan. 10, 1958
Louis Prima and Keely Smith - Jan. 17, 1958
Jo Stafford - Jan. 24, 1958
Sammy Davis, Jr. - Jan. 31, 1958
Jeannie Carson - Feb. 7, 1958
Shirley Jones - Feb. 14, 1958
A Time to Cry - Feb. 21, 1958
Van Johnson - Feb. 28, 1958
Edie Adams - Mar. 7, 1958
Eydie Gormé - Mar. 14, 1958
The Man on the Stairs - Mar. 21, 1958
Eddie Fisher - Mar. 28, 1958
Spike Jones and Helen Grayco - Apr. 4, 1958
The Brownstone Incident - Apr. 18, 1958 
Ethel Merman - Apr. 25, 1958
Ella Fitzgerald - May 9, 1958
The Green Grass of Saint Theresa - May 16, 1958
Pat Suzuki and Natalie Wood - May 23, 1958
Face of Fear - May 30, 1958
The Seedling Doubt - Jun. 6, 1958

External links

Episode guide and summary from classictv.com

1957 American television series debuts
1958 American television series endings
American Broadcasting Company original programming
1950s American drama television series
1950s American variety television series
Frank Sinatra
Black-and-white American television shows
English-language television shows